Voices is the second studio album by American electronic rock duo Phantogram, released February 18, 2014 by Republic Records. It was produced by the band and John Hill. Steven Drozd of the Flaming Lips contributed to the song "Never Going Home".

Reception

The album received a Metacritic score of 74 out of 100 based on 23 critics, indicating generally favorable reviews. Alternative Press critic Reed Fischer rated the album 4.5 out of 5 stars, saying that Phantogram "pull away from the pack" on their latest album, and that their "electronic and electric guitar alchemy has simultaneously become more infectious and complex than ever before".

The album debuted at No. 11 on the Billboard 200, and No. 3 on Top Rock Albums, selling around 20,000 in the first week. The album sold 115,000 copies in the United States as of July 2016.

In media
"Black Out Days" was featured in Twilight: Full Moon, the "Kill Me, Kill Me, Kill Me" (2014) episode of How to Get Away with Murder, The Originals (episode six, season one),  and the "Impractical Applications" (2016) episode of The Magicians.

Track listing

Charts

Album

Year-end charts

References 

Phantogram (band) albums
2014 albums
Republic Records albums
Albums produced by John Hill (record producer)